Stone Mountain is a mountain near Atlanta, Georgia, United States.

Stone Mountain is located in Stone Mountain Park in the town of Stone Mountain, Georgia

Stone Mountain may also refer to:

Places

Canada 
Stone Mountain Provincial Park, British Columbia

United States 
Stone Mountain (Virginia), near Norton, Virginia
Stone Mountain (Pennsylvania), along the Kishacoquillas Valley of central Pennsylvania
Stone Mountain State Park, a North Carolina State Park
Stone Mountain (North Carolina), a dome of exposed granite central to the North Carolina State Park of the same name
Stone Mountain Arts Center in Brownfield, Maine

Other 

In fiction, Stone Mountain is a dwarven nation on Midkemia, a world created by Raymond E. Feist.
There is a Stone Mountain on the Moon. It was visited during the Apollo 16 mission.

Television 
 "Stone Mountain" (30 Rock), a fourth season episode of the American sitcom 30 Rock